Mazgan (also Romanized as Mazgān and Mozgān; also known as Mazqān, Mozhgan, and Mozjān) is a village in Khurheh Rural District, in the Central District of Mahallat County, Markazi Province, Iran. At the 2006 census, its population was 15, in 6 families.

References 

Populated places in Mahallat County